The Rockwell Formation is a late Devonian and early Mississippian mapped bedrock unit in West Virginia, Maryland, and Pennsylvania, in the United States.

Description
The Rockwell Formation was described at its type section at Rockwell Run in West Virginia as soft arkosic sandstone, fine hard conglomerate, and buff hackly shale.

The formation was originally described in West Virginia by Stose and Swartz (1912).  It was first described in Maryland by H. E. Vokes (1957), and later described in central Pennsylvania by C. R. Wood (1980).

Stratigraphy
The Rockwell is generally considered a Formation.  At Formation rank, it has several members, including the Patton and Riddlesburg Shale Members, and the Finzel Tongue.

It has been reduced in rank to a member of the Price Formation in West Virginia.

The Rockwell is a lateral equivalent of the Huntley Mountain Formation and the Spechty Kopf Formation, as all three underlie the prominent Pocono Formation and its lateral equivalent, the Burgoon Sandstone.

Lessing, Dean, and Kulander (1992) mapped the Meadow Branch synclinorium in Berkeley County, West Virginia, and noted that the Rockwell is approximately 200 meters thick here and that a 2-meter thick diamictite is present near the base.

See also
Geology of Pennsylvania
Huntley Mountain Formation

References 

Devonian System of North America
Mississippian United States
Sandstone formations of the United States
Shale formations of the United States
Devonian Maryland
Devonian geology of Pennsylvania
Devonian West Virginia
Geologic formations of Maryland
Geologic formations of Pennsylvania
Geologic formations of West Virginia